The men's freestyle heavyweight competition at the 1964 Summer Olympics in Tokyo took place from 11 to 14 October at the Komazawa Gymnasium. Nations were limited to one competitor.

Competition format

This freestyle wrestling competition continued to use the "bad points" elimination system introduced at the 1928 Summer Olympics for Greco-Roman and at the 1932 Summer Olympics for freestyle wrestling, as adjusted at the 1960 Summer Olympics. Each bout awarded 4 points. If the victory was by fall, the winner received 0 and the loser 4. If the victory was by decision, the winner received 1 and the loser 3. If the bout was tied, each wrestler received 2 points. A wrestler who accumulated 6 or more points was eliminated. Rounds continued until there were 3 or fewer uneliminated wrestlers. If only 1 wrestler remained, he received the gold medal. If 2 wrestlers remained, point totals were ignored and they faced each other for gold and silver (if they had already wrestled each other, that result was used). If 3 wrestlers remained, point totals were ignored and a round-robin was held among those 3 to determine medals (with previous head-to-head results, if any, counting for this round-robin).

Results

Round 1

 Bouts

 Points

Round 2

Only 1 of the 13 wrestlers was eliminated, in large part due to there being 3 ties in the first two rounds.

 Bouts

 Points

Round 3

Six of the 12 wrestlers were eliminated, including one who won during the round.

 Bouts

 Points

Round 4

Akhmedov and McNamara started at 3 points each; the winner would continue while the loser would be eliminated (both would remain in with a draw). Akhmedov prevailed, eliminated McNamara. Kaplan and Kubát faced each other with both starting at 5 points; each needed to win by fall to stay in competition, so a tie eliminated both. Ivanitsky, starting at 1 point, was in no danger of elimination; his win over Stîngu eliminated the latter man. 

Because McNamara, Kaplan, and Kubát tied for third place at 7 points, they moved to a round-robin for the bronze medal.

 Bouts

 Points

Final round

Kaplan and Kubát tied in round 4; that result counted for the bronze medal round-robin. McNamara lost to both other wrestlers, finishing fifth. Kaplan took the bronze medal over Kubát based on lower body weight.

In the final, Akhmedov and Ivanitsky tied. Akhmedov had fewer total points throughout the tournament, so won the gold medal.

 Bronze medal bouts

 Final

 Points

References

Wrestling at the 1964 Summer Olympics